Prosipho tuberculatus is a species of sea snail, a marine gastropod mollusk in the family Buccinidae, the true whelks.

References

Buccinidae
Gastropods described in 1915